OBR may refer to:

 OBR Open Building Research, a collective, Italy
 OBR Records, a record label
 Office for Budget Responsibility, UK
 One Billion Rising, a campaign against violence to women